Daniel Hernán Opazo (born 8 November 1996) is an Argentine professional footballer who plays as a forward for Deportes Puerto Montt.

Career
Opazo had youth spells with Maronese and Cipolletti. His senior career started in 2015 with Torneo Federal B club 25 de Mayo, with whom he made nine appearances. In 2016, Opazo rejoined Cipolletti of Torneo Federal A. He made his debut in March 2016 against Independiente, later making four more appearances in 2016. In the following season, Opazo made sixteen appearances and scored six goals, including his career first versus Deportivo Madryn on 9 April 2017. On 16 July 2017, Opazo joined Primera División side Newell's Old Boys on a four-year contract. His pro league debut came in a draw with Unión Santa Fe.

Opazo was loaned to San Martín on 8 July 2018. He returned to Newell's Old Boys in December after no competitive matches for San Martín. Opazo subsequently signed for Cipolletti on loan in February 2019. Opazo returned to Newell's at the end of the year, as his contract there expired. In January 2020, Opazo rejoined Cipolletti on a free transfer. He was released during the COVID-19 pandemic, having scored a total of five goals in 2019–20.

On 24 October 2020, Opazo joined Chilean Primera B de Chile club Unión San Felipe. On 24 June 2022, he joined Deportes Puerto Montt.

Career statistics
.

References

External links

1996 births
Living people
People from Neuquén
Argentine footballers
Argentine expatriate footballers
Association football forwards
Torneo Federal A players
Argentine Primera División players
Primera B de Chile players
Primera Nacional players
Club Cipolletti footballers
Newell's Old Boys footballers
San Martín de San Juan footballers
Unión San Felipe footballers
Deportivo Madryn players
Puerto Montt footballers
Argentine expatriate sportspeople in Chile
Expatriate footballers in Chile